Herbert Rauter (born 27 January 1982) is an Austrian former professional footballer who played as forward.

External links
 
 

Living people
1982 births
Austrian footballers
Austrian Football Bundesliga players
Association football forwards
SK Sturm Graz players
DSV Leoben players
Grazer AK players
SC Wiener Neustadt players
SC Ritzing players